Bisarikati Charkhanda is a village in the Barisal District of the Barisal Division within Bangladesh.

References

Populated places in Barisal District